Chimes of Freedom: The Songs of Bob Dylan Honoring 50 Years of Amnesty International is a charity compilation album featuring new recordings of compositions by Bob Dylan by multiple artists, released on January 24, 2012. Proceeds from the album were donated to the human rights organization Amnesty International. It debuted in the U.S at number 11 on the Billboard 200 with 22,000 copies sold while the 2-CD version available at Starbucks debuted at number 38 with more than 10,200 copies sold.

Featured artists include Diana Krall, Johnny Cash, Adele, Miley Cyrus, My Chemical Romance, Silversun Pickups, Kesha, The Gaslight Anthem, Pete Townshend, Seal, Jeff Beck, Elvis Costello, Mark Knopfler, Darren Criss, Eric Burdon, Sting, Patti Smith, My Morning Jacket, Pete Seeger, Steve Earle and Rise Against.

The 4-disc CD version of the album features 73 tracks - with a further 3 tracks available on a digital-only basis - making for a total of 76 tracks. Among the 76 recordings is Bob Dylan's original 1964 recording of the title track.  Of the other 75 tracks, 69 were brand-new studio recordings purpose-made for the album. The other 6 tracks were recent live performances recorded for other purposes by the artists and subsequently donated for inclusion on the album.

Track listing

Music videos

Of the 69 new studio recordings, Amnesty made music videos for 16 tracks.

  Jeff Beck & Seal - "Like a Rolling Stone" 
 Eric Burdon - "Gotta Serve Somebody" 
 Darren Criss - "New Morning" 
  Miley Cyrus - "You're Gonna Make Me Lonesome When You Go" 
 Neil Finn with Pajama Club - "She Belongs to Me" 
 Flogging Molly - "The Times They Are A-Changin'" 
 Kris Kristofferson - "Quinn the Eskimo (The Mighty Quinn)" 
 Oren Lavie - "4th Time Around" 
 Outernational - "When the Ship Comes In" 
 Joe Perry - "Man of Peace" 
  Rise Against - "Ballad Of Hollis Brown" 
 Pete Seeger - "Forever Young" 
 The Airborne Toxic Event - "Boots Of Spanish Leather" 
 Pete Townshend - "Corrina, Corrina" 
 We Are Augustines - "Mama, You Been On My Mind" 
 Evan Rachel Wood - "I'd Have You Anytime"

Promotional TV performances

5 of the artists who recorded tracks made promotional appearances on US or UK TV shows performing their contribution to the album:

 The Avett Brothers - "One Too Many Mornings" -  Late Night with Jimmy Fallon 
 Dierks Bentley & Punch Brothers - "Señor" - The Ellen DeGeneres Show 
 Mick Hucknall  - "One of Us Must Know (Sooner or Later)" - The Ronnie Wood Show (Sky TV) 
 Ziggy Marley - "Blowin' in the Wind" - Late Show with David Letterman 
 Joe Perry - "Man of Peace" - The Tonight Show with Jay Leno

Mini documentaries

Amnesty created "making-of" mini-documentaries about the recording of 9 of the 69 new studio tracks.

 Jeff Beck & Seal: "Like A Rolling Stone" 
 Billy Bragg: "Lay Down Your Weary Tune" 
 Mick Hucknall: "One Of Us Must Know" 
 Joe Perry: "Man Of Peace" 
 Rise Against: "Ballad Of Hollis Brown" 
 Paul Rodgers & Nils Lofgren: "Abandoned Love" 
 Pete Seeger: "Forever Young" 
 Pete Townshend: "Corrina Corrina"  
 Evan Rachel Wood: "I'd Have You Anytime"

See also
List of songs written by Bob Dylan
List of artists who have covered Bob Dylan songs

References

External links
 Official site

2012 compilation albums
Amnesty International
Bob Dylan tribute albums
Charity albums